The following table indicates the party of elected officials in the U.S. state of Nevada:
Governor
Lieutenant Governor
Secretary of State
Attorney General
State Treasurer
State Controller

The table also indicates the historical party composition in the:
State Senate
State Assembly
State delegation to the U.S. Senate
State delegation to the U.S. House of Representatives

For years in which a presidential election was held, the table indicates which party's nominees received the state's electoral votes as well as whether the nominees won the election.

1861–1982

1983–present

References

See also
Politics in Nevada
Elections in Nevada

Politics of Nevada
Government of Nevada
Nevada